Xu Lu (born 28 December 1994), also known as Lulu Xu,  is a Chinese actress and singer. She first became recognized in China for her role in the drama Empresses in the Palace (2012) and internationally with the drama One and a Half Summer (2014) and Love Scenery (2021).

Career  
Xu Lu has been educated at a military school since she was 10 years old, which then propelled her to attend People's Liberation Army Academy of Art, majoring in drama. She debuted as an actress through The Dream of Red Mansions as the teenage Xue Baoqin. But her breakthrough came with Empresses in the Palace. Even though her character Zhen Yurao only started to appear in the latter part of drama, she captivated the viewers with her fresh innocent look and her romantic subplot with Aisin-Gioro Yunxi.

She became known internationally by starring in a college romance drama, One and a Half Summer alongside Nichkhun and Jiang Jinfu. In 2015, Xu Lu participated in the 1st season of We Are In Love, the licensed remake of popular South Korean's variety show We Got Married, in which her virtual pairing with Qiao Renliang gained huge popularity up until Qiao's death in September 2016.

Among her projects in 2017 were director Guan Hu's adaptation of Ghost Blows Out the Light book series, The Weasel Grave; big budget fantasy Tribes and Empires: Storm of Prophecy; and youth musical film Our Shining Days, which she was awarded for at the Shanghai International Film Festival.

One of her works in 2019 is period piece Spy Hunter by the acclaimed director-writer duo Li Lu (In the Name of People) and Zhang Yong (The Disguiser). For historical series The Longest Day in Chang'an, she has joined the list of actresses who have portrayed Yang Guifei, a famous historical figure and one of the Four Beauties of ancient China.

Filmography

Film

Television series

Variety show

Discography

Awards and nominations

References

External links

1994 births
Living people
21st-century Chinese actresses
Chinese television actresses
Chinese film actresses
Actresses from Inner Mongolia
People from Hohhot
People's Liberation Army Arts College alumni